Dashtabad (also Romanized as Dashtābād) is a village in Fahraj Rural District, in the Central District of Fahraj County, Kerman Province, Iran. At the 2006 census, its population was 21, in 6 families.

References 

Populated places in Fahraj County